Asterixis, more colloquially referred to as flapping tremor, is a tremor of the hand when the wrist is extended, sometimes said to resemble a bird flapping its wings.  This motor disorder is characterized by an inability to maintain a position, which is demonstrated by jerking movements of the outstretched hands when bent upward at the wrist.  The tremor is caused by abnormal function of the diencephalic motor centers in the brain, which regulate the muscles involved in maintaining position.  Asterixis is associated with various encephalopathies due especially to faulty metabolism. The term derives from the Greek a, "not" and stērixis, "fixed position".

Asterixis is the inability to maintain posture due to a metabolic encephalopathy.  This can be elicited on physical exam by having the patient extend their arms and bend their hands back.
With a metabolic encephalopathy, the patient is unable to hold their hands back resulting in a “flapping” motion consistent with asterixis.  It can be seen in any metabolic encephalopathy e.g. chronic kidney failure, severe congestive heart failure, acute respiratory failure and commonly in decompensated liver failure.

Associated conditions and presentation
Usually there are brief, arrhythmic interruptions of sustained voluntary muscle contraction causing brief lapses of posture, with a frequency of 3–5 Hz.  It is bilateral, but may be asymmetric.  Unilateral asterixis may occur with structural brain disease.
 It can be a sign of hepatic encephalopathy, damage to brain cells presumably due to the inability of the liver to metabolize ammonia to urea.  The cause is thought to be predominantly related to abnormal ammonia metabolism.
 Asterixis is seen most often in drowsy or stuporous patients with metabolic encephalopathies, especially in decompensated cirrhosis or acute liver failure.
 It is also seen in some patients with kidney failure and azotemia.
 It can also be a feature of Wilson's disease.
 Asterixis is also seen in respiratory failure due to carbon dioxide toxicity (hypercapnia).
 Some drugs are known to cause asterixis, particularly phenytoin (when it is known as phenytoin flap). Other drugs implicated include benzodiazepines, salicylates, barbiturates, valproate, gabapentin, lithium, ceftazidime, and metoclopramide.

History
R.D. Adams and J.M. Foley first described asterixis in 1949 in patients with severe liver failure and encephalopathy. Initially Foley and Adams referred to asterixis simply as "tremor" but realized that they needed a more appropriate term. On a literature search they found a poorly described phenomenon in similar patients mentioned by German physicians called “jactitations” but the reference was vague. Foley consulted Father Cadigan, a Jesuit classics scholar, who suggested “anisosterixis” (an "negative"–iso "equal"–sterixis "firmness") but Foley shortened this to asterixis due to the former being too difficult to pronounce. They introduced the term in 1953 by way of a medical abstract and later Adams solidified its medical use as he was an author and editor of the widely influential Harrison's Principles of Internal Medicine.

References

External links 

 Diagram

Symptoms and signs: Nervous system